Sushilavati Government Women's College is a state run undergraduate women's college located in sector two of city Rourkela. S. G. Women's College was established in the year 1967 by Mrs. Sushilavati Khosla who was wife of ex- governor of Odisha Dr. Ajudhiya Nath Khosla. She donated an amount of Rs one lakh for starting this college in collaboration with D.A.V Trust. In the year 1989 the administration and funding of college was taken by Government of Odisha to run its education curriculum. The college got its accreditation by NACC with grade B certification in the year 2005. The college is affiliated to Sambalpur University to offer students three years of regular undergraduate courses of Arts (B.A) and Science (B.Sc.).

See also
S.K.D.A.V. Government Polytechnic, Rourkela
Sushilavati Government Women’s Junior College, Rourkela

References

Women's universities and colleges in Odisha
Universities and colleges in Rourkela
Educational institutions established in 1967
1967 establishments in Orissa